Prathivadhi Bhayankara Sreenivas (22 September 1930 – 14 April 2013) widely known as P. B. Sreenivas was an Indian playback singer, composer, harmonium player, lyricist,   littérateur, and poet known for his works in South cinema, and Bollywood. His major chunk of work has been in Kannada, Tamil, and Telugu languages. He has garnered the Kannada Rajyotsava Prashasti, the Tamil Kalaimamani Award, and the Madhavapeddi Satyam Award by the Andhra Siva Foundation, for his contributions to music and cinema. In his honor, Sri Kala Sudha Telugu Association of Chennai, instituted the P. B. Sreenivas Mahapurush Award to honor veteran singers.

Early life
Prathivadhi Bhayankara Sreenivas was born into a Tamil speaking musician family of Prathivadhi Bhayankara Phanindraswamy and Seshagiriamma as their younger son in Kakinada, East Godavari district, Andhra Pradesh. His father was a civil servant and his mother was a musician. His father wanted him to become a government officer and Sreenivas was awarded a Bachelor of Commerce degree and then passed the Hindi Visharad from the Dakshina Bharat Hindi Prachar Sabha.

Musical career
His uncle, Kidambi Krishnaswamy, was a drama artist and a singer. When Sreenivas was 12, Krishnaswamy gave him a chance to sing in a drama. Later, Sreenivas, a trained harmonium player and singer, went to Gemini Studios, Madras. Emani Sankara Sastry, a veena player, was one of the residing musicians. He introduced Sreenivas to S. S. Vasan, the owner of Gemini Studios. There, Sreenivas sang a super hit song sung by Mohammed Rafi, his favourite singer. It was "Huye Hum Jinke Liye Barbad", from Deedar (1951), composed by Naushad Ali, which landed him the opportunity to become professional playback singer.

Biography on PBS 

The biography titled Madhurya Saarvabhowma Dr. P. B. Srinivas-Naadayogiya Sunaadayaana (penned by R. Srinath, Publishers: Surabhi Prakashana, Bengaluru) was released on 7 May 2013 at the Palace Grounds, Bangalore by the singers S. P. Balasubrahmanyam, Vani Jairam and K. J. Yesudas.

Awards
 The second highest award of Karnataka State, the Kannada Rajyothsava Award awarded by the chief minister of the state
 The Tamil Nadu state's honorary Kalaimamani Award
 Dr. Rajkumar Souhardha award given by the super star's family
The prestigious Karnataka Nadoja Award - constituted by Kannada University, Hampi, Karnataka awarded by the governor of Karnataka
 Tamil Nadu State Film Honorary Award - Kalaivanar Award in 2002

Death
Sreenivas died of Heart attack at home in Chennai on 14 April 2013 at the age of 82. He was cremated on the next day. He was survived by his wife and children.

References

External links
 

1930 births
Telugu people
Kannada playback singers
Tamil playback singers
Telugu playback singers
Malayalam playback singers
Indian male playback singers
Bollywood playback singers
Harmonium players
20th-century Indian singers
Singers from Andhra Pradesh
People from Kakinada
Performers of Hindu music
Sanskrit-language singers
Film musicians from Andhra Pradesh
2013 deaths
20th-century Indian male singers